The Emulex hoax, an instance of securities fraud, was perpetrated by 23-year-old Mark Jakob on August 24, 2000.

Jakob, a former employee of the press release distribution service Internet Wire, was facing a loss of almost $100,000 as a result of short-selling stock in the Emulex Corporation, a fiber-optic equipment manufacturer. To cover his losses, Jakob wrote a fake release stating that Emulex's CEO had quit and the company was restating its quarterly earnings from a profit to a loss. Jakob then sent it to Internet Wire, posing as an Emulex publicist.

The next morning, the phony release was picked up by Bloomberg Television and other news outlets.  Emulex's stock price on the NASDAQ stock exchange dropped from $103.94 to $43.00 in only 16 minutes of morning trading, losing $2.2 billion in market capitalization.

The press release was a fraudulent short and distort stock manipulation. Bloomberg picked up Jakob's fake release at around 10:13 a.m., just as Emulex, headquartered in California, was opening its doors for the day, and the stock price fell 62% before Emulex found the fake release and asked the National Association of Securities Dealers to halt trading, which it did at 10:29 a.m. Once the release had been conclusively debunked, trading resumed on Emulex and the share price recovered almost immediately to close at $105.75.

The FBI traced the release to Mark Jakob, who had realized a profit of more than $240,000 by shorting the stock. Jakob pled guilty and was sentenced to 44 months in prison, forfeiting the gains and owing an additional $103,000 in penalties. Jakob's fraud cost Emulex shareholders almost  $110 million.

References

Finance fraud